Minneapolis Auditorium was an indoor arena in Minneapolis, Minnesota. It hosted the NBA's Minneapolis Lakers from 1947 until they moved to the Minneapolis Armory in 1959. The arena held 10,000 people and was built in 1927. The building fell into obscurity after the opening of the Met Center in suburban Bloomington.  It was demolished in 1988 to make way for the Minneapolis Convention Center.

According to the Minneapolis magazine, when opened it opened on June 4, 1927, the Auditorium had a seating capacity of 5,687 on its balcony, 4,160 on its floor, and 698 on the stage, for a total of 10,545 (roughly 6,800 for ice hockey or figure skating). Construction of the building took 3.25 million bricks, 15,000 yards of concrete, and 5,000 tons of steel.

References

External links
Minneapolis Auditorium History

Basketball venues in Minnesota
Sports venues in Minneapolis
Minneapolis Lakers venues
Demolished sports venues in Minnesota
Defunct indoor arenas in the United States
Demolished music venues in the United States
Former National Basketball Association venues
Basketball Association of America venues
Demolished buildings and structures in Minnesota
1927 establishments in Minnesota
National Basketball League (United States) venues
Sports venues completed in 1927
1989 disestablishments in Minnesota
Sports venues demolished in 1989